The Depot Covered Bridge is a historic Town lattice truss bridge, carrying Depot Hill Road over Otter Creek in Pittsford, Vermont.  The bridge was built about 1840, and is one of Vermont's older covered bridges.  It underwent restoration in the 1980s, and was subsequently reinforced with steel stringers.  It was listed on the National Register of Historic Places in 1974.

Description and history
The Depot Covered Bridge is located near the geographic center of Pittsford, west of the main village, on Depot Hill Road, which provides access from the village to the western part of the community. It is single-span Town lattice structure, set on stone abutments that have been faced in concrete. The bridge is sheathed in vertical board siding, and its roof is slate. The bridge deck is now supported by steel stringers.

The bridge was built about 1840, and was one of four surviving 19th-century covered bridges in Pittsford in 1974, when it was listed on the National Register of Historic Places.  It underwent restoration in 1974, at which time the abutments were faced in concrete, and in 2006 its deck was supported by steel stringers.

See also
National Register of Historic Places listings in Rutland County, Vermont
List of Vermont covered bridges
List of bridges on the National Register of Historic Places in Vermont

References

Road bridges on the National Register of Historic Places in Vermont
Bridges completed in 1840
Covered bridges in Rutland County, Vermont
Buildings and structures in Pittsford, Vermont
National Register of Historic Places in Rutland County, Vermont
Steel bridges in the United States
Wooden bridges in Vermont
Lattice truss bridges in the United States